Kashalya (Käşäle) is a rural locality (a village) in Nugushevsky Selsoviet, Meleuzovsky District, Bashkortostan, Russia. The population was 1 as of 2010. There is 1 street.

Geography 
Kashalya is located 227 km northeast of Meleuz (the district's administrative centre) by road. Verkhny Nugush is the nearest rural locality.

See also 

 Bashkortostan, region of Kashalya

References 

Rural localities in Meleuzovsky District